DC Comics insert previews were 16-page comic book stories inserted into issues of existing DC Comics series to promote new series usually debuting the next month. Running from 1980 to 1985, they consisted of a front cover, 14 pages of story, and a back cover that depicted the cover of the actual first issue. The addition of the insert did not entail an increase in the price of the comic book, and the cover copy called the insert "a special free 16-page comic!"

Publication history 
The insert previews began with The New Teen Titans in DC Comics Presents #26 (Oct. 1980). This reboot of an existing property by writer Marv Wolfman and artist George Pérez introduced several new characters and would become a sales success for DC. Wolfman would additionally write previews for a reboot of the "Dial 'H' for Hero" feature and for Night Force a supernatural series drawn by Gene Colan, his former collaborator on The Tomb of Dracula. DC highlighted the work of Roy Thomas, newly arrived at the company from Marvel Comics, by featuring several of his series in the format. These included All-Star Squadron, a revival of the Justice Society of America; Arak, Son of Thunder, a new Native American character; a revitalization of Wonder Woman including an update of the character's costume; and Captain Carrot and His Amazing Zoo Crew! a combination of the talking animal and superhero genres. When the long running The Brave and the Bold series came to its conclusion, the final issue featured a preview of a new Batman series, Batman and the Outsiders by writer Mike W. Barr and artist Jim Aparo, which would be described by DC Comics writer and executive Paul Levitz as being "a team series more fashionable to 1980s audiences". New talent such as the writing team of Dan Mishkin and Gary Cohn was represented in the previews with Amethyst, Princess of Gemworld and Blue Devil. Licensed properties were featured as well. A Masters of the Universe preview featured in several comic books cover dated November 1982 led to a miniseries the following month. The Atari Force preview in January 1983 served as a prequel to the ongoing series launched a year later.
M.A.S.K. was a cartoon series and a Kenner Products toyline adapted into comic books in a September 1985 preview which led to a miniseries the following December.

The issues

Collected editions
The following insert preview stories have been reprinted in collected editions:
 The New Teen Titans story from DC Comics Presents #26 (October 1980) in:
 The New Teen Titans Archives Vol. 1, 240 pages, February 1999, 
 The New Teen Titans Omnibus Vol. 1, 684 pages, September 2011, 
 The New Teen Titans Vol. 1, 240 pages, September 2014, 
 The All-Star Squadron story from Justice League of America #193 (August 1981) in: 
 Showcase Presents: All-Star Squadron Vol. 1, 528 pages, April 2012,  
 Justice Society of America: A Celebration of 75 Years, 496 pages, July 2015, 
 The Wonder Woman story from DC Comics Presents #41 (January 1982) in:
 Wonder Woman: 80 Years of the Amazon Warrior The Deluxe Edition, 416 pages, September 2021, 
 The Captain Carrot and His Amazing Zoo Crew story from The New Teen Titans #16 (February 1982) in:
 Captain Carrot and the Final Ark, 168 pages, April 2008, 
 Showcase Presents: Captain Carrot and His Amazing Zoo Crew, 672 pages, September 2014, 
 The Night Force story from The New Teen Titans #21 (July 1982) in:
 Night Force by Marv Wolfman and Gene Colan: The Complete Series, 396 pages, October 2017, 
 The Masters of the Universe story from various DC Comics titles (November 1982) in:
 DC Through the 80s: The End of Eras, 520 pages, December 2020, 
 The Amethyst, Princess of Gemworld story from Legion of Super-Heroes vol. 2 #298 (April 1983) in:
 Showcase Presents: Amethyst, Princess of Gemworld Vol. 1, 648 pages, October 2012, 
 The Batman and the Outsiders story from The Brave and the Bold #200 (July 1983) in:
 Showcase Presents: Batman and the Outsiders Vol. 1, 552 pages, September 2007, 
 Batman and the Outsiders Vol. 1, 368 pages, February 2017,

See also
 DC Comics Bonus Book
 Pandora Pann

References

Notes

External links 
 Daily Planet Volume 80 Issue #22 (October 1980) house advertisement for The New Teen Titans insert preview at Mike's Amazing World of Comics
 Daily Planet Volume 80 Issue #26 (November 1980) house advertisement for "Dial 'H' For Hero insert preview at Mike's Amazing World of Comics 
 DC Bonus Books (including the insert previews) at Mike's Amazing World of Comics
 

1980 comics debuts
1980 in comics
1981 in comics
1982 in comics
1983 in comics
1984 in comics
1985 comics endings
1985 in comics
Comics by George Pérez
Comics by Gerry Conway
Comics by Marv Wolfman
Comics by Michael Fleisher
Comics by Paul Kupperberg
Comics by Roy Thomas
DC Comics-related lists
DC Comics titles
Defunct American comics
Insert previews
Superhero comics